Onassis may refer to:

People with the name 

 Aristotle Onassis (1906–1975), a Greek shipping magnate
 Alexander Onassis (1948–1973), son of Aristotle Onassis
 Christina Onassis (1950–1988), a Greek shipping magnate and daughter of Aristotle Onassis
 Athina Onassis Roussel (1985–), daughter of Christina Onassis
 Erick Onassis (1968–), an American rapper also known as Erick Sermon
 Jacqueline Kennedy Onassis (1929–1994), the wife of U.S. President John F. Kennedy (later the wife of Aristotle Onassis)

Other uses

 Onassis glasses, a style of oversized sunglasses popularized by Jacqueline Onassis